{{Infobox military unit
| unit_name                     = The New Brunswick Scottish
| country                       = 
| type                          = Line Infantry
| branch                        = Canadian Army
| dates                         = 1946 - 1954
| specialization                = Infantry
| command_structure             = Royal Canadian Infantry Corps
| size                          = One battalion
| garrison                      = Saint John, New Brunswick
| motto                         = Nunquam Non Paratus
| colors                        = Facing colour blue
| march                         = Quick - All the Blue Bonnets are over the Border, Highland Laddie & Pibroch o' Donald Dhu
| mascot                        = 
| identification_symbol         = Leslie, Dress
| identification_symbol_label   = Tartan
}}
The New Brunswick Scottish was an infantry regiment of the Canadian Army.

 History 
Founded as The South New Brunswick Regiment in 1946 by the amalgamation of The Saint John Fusiliers (M.G.) and The New Brunswick Rangers, the regiment acquired its present title in 1946 shortly after establishment.  In 1954, as a result of the Kennedy Report on the Reserve Army,  this regiment was amalgamated with The Carleton and York Regiment to form 1st Battalion The Royal New Brunswick Regiment (Carleton and York).

The regiment before amalgamation held its final Order of Precedence as 30.

 Perpetuations 
The regiment perpetuated the following units:

 26th Battalion, CEF
 55th Battalion (New Brunswick & Prince Edward Island), CEF
 115th Battalion (New Brunswick), CEF 
 145th Battalion (New Brunswick), CEF
 236th Battalion (New Brunswick Kilties), CEF
 7th M.G. Battalion C.E.F

 Alliances 
The New Brunswick Scottish were allied to the King's Own Scottish Borderers.

 Uniform 
The New Brunswick Scottish were kitted with a blue glengarry c/w diced border, scarlet doublet, white sporran with two black points, scarlet & black hose, blue doublets for pipers and tartan trews for bandsmen, with full dress only for pipers and bandsmen.

Battle honours

 South African War 

 South Africa 1899–1900 & 1902

 The Great War 

 Mount Sorrel,
 Somme 1916 & 18
 Flers-Courcelette
 Thiepval
 Ancre Heights
 Arras 1917 & 18
 Vimy 1917
 Arleux
 Scarpe 1917 & 18
 Hill 70
 Ypres 1917
 Passchendaele
 Amiens
 Hindenburg Line
 Canal du Nord
 Cambrai 1918
 Pursuit to Mons
 France and Flanders 1915-18

 See also 
 Canadian-Scottish regiment

References

Barnes, RM, The Uniforms and History of the Scottish Regiments'', London, Sphere Books Limited, 1972.

Royal New Brunswick Regiment
Former infantry regiments of Canada
Highland & Scottish regiments of Canada
Scottish regiments
Military units and formations of New Brunswick
Military units and formations established in 1946
Military units and formations disestablished in 1954